Ağahüseyn Mustafayev (born 11 April 1989) is an Azerbaijani freestyle wrestler. He won the silver medal in the 70 kg event at the 2020 European Wrestling Championships held in Rome, Italy. In 2019, he also won the silver medal in this event.

In 2013, he competed at the Summer Universiade held in Kazan, Russia without winning a medal. He represented Azerbaijan at the 2015 Military World Games where he won one of the bronze medals in the 65 kg event.

Major results

References

External links 
 

Living people
1989 births
Place of birth missing (living people)
Azerbaijani male sport wrestlers
Competitors at the 2013 Summer Universiade
European Wrestling Championships medalists
21st-century Azerbaijani people